Bjarkøy is a former municipality in Troms county, Norway.  The  municipality existed from 1838 until it was merged with Harstad Municipality on 1 January 2013.  The administrative centre of the municipality was the village of Nergården on the island of Bjarkøya.  The island municipality was spread across several islands: Bjarkøya, Sandsøya, Grytøya (northern half), Krøttøya, and many smaller ones.  Originally, the municipality also included the southwestern part of the large island of Senja.

One of the reasons why Bjarkøy merged with Harstad in 2013 was due to the promised funding of the Bjarkøy Fixed Link project.  It would link the main islands of Bjarkøy together with a bridge and undersea road tunnel enabling residents to drive further which would drastically shorten the ferry ride to Harstad.

General information

The prestegjeld (church parish) of Sand was established as a municipality on 1 January 1838 (see formannskapsdistrikt). The name was later changed to Bjarkøy.  During the 1960s, there were many municipal mergers across Norway due to the work of the Schei Committee.  On 1 January 1964, the southernmost part of the island of Senja (the Senjehesten peninsula) and the Lemmingsvær island (total population of the two locations: 480) was transferred from Bjarkøy to Tranøy Municipality. On 1 January 2013, Bjarkøy Municipality was merged with Harstad Municipality to the south, forming a new, larger municipality called Harstad.

Name
The municipality was named after the island of Bjarkøya (Old Norse: Bjarkarey). The first element is the genitive case of bjørk which means "birch" and the last element is øy which means "island". (The name of the island, since it is an old trading place, is perhaps inspired by the name of the old and well-known town of Birka in Sweden, which has the same meaning).

Prior to 1887, the municipality was called Sand after the name of the church site on the nearby island of Sandsøya.  In 1887, the church was moved to the island of Bjarkøya, so the municipal name was changed to Bjarkø (an older spelling).  More recent spelling reforms have it spelled Bjarkøy.

Coat of arms
The coat of arms was granted on 11 April 1986. The official blazon is "Azure, a demi-griffin passant Or". This means the arms have a blue field (background) and the charge is a demi-griffin (upper half showing, no legs). The griffin has a tincture of Or which means it is commonly colored yellow, but if it is made out of metal, then gold is used. Bjarkøy wanted to have its coat of arms to be the same as those used by the medieval Bjarkøy noble family, however, the old 13th century family arms were already in use by Troms county. So a variation was adopted - a demi-griffin was used instead. This family was one of the most influential families in the northern part of Norway during medieval times. They used a griffin for the arms of the family starting in the late 13th century.  The arms were designed by Øystein H. Skaugvolldal. The arms of Bjarkøy were retired after the merger in 2013 since Harstad retained its old coat of arms after the merger.

Churches
The Church of Norway had one parish within the municipality of Bjarkøy. It was part of the Trondenes prosti (deanery) in the Diocese of Nord-Hålogaland.

History
This is old Viking territory, and it was a chieftain seat during the Viking Age and the Middle Ages. Among the more famous chieftains you find Thorir Hund, who killed Norway's Patron Saint, Saint Olav in the Battle of Stiklestad in 1030. In 1323, the chieftain seat was raided and burned by Karelian and Novgorod warriors.

Geography
The municipality of Bjarkøy was located entirely on islands.  The largest island, Grytøya, was shared with the municipality of Harstad.  Other islands included Bjarkøya, Sandsøya, Helløya, Flatøya, and Meløyvær.  The Andfjorden flowed along the northern and western side of the municipality and the Vågsfjorden flowed on the eastern and southern sides of the municipality.

Climate

Government
All municipalities in Norway, including Bjarkøy, are responsible for primary education (through 10th grade), outpatient health services, senior citizen services, unemployment and other social services, zoning, economic development, and municipal roads.  The municipality is governed by a municipal council of elected representatives, which in turn elects a mayor.

Municipal council
The municipal council  of Bjarkøy was made up of 13 representatives that were elected to four year terms.  The party breakdown of the final municipal council was as follows:

Media gallery

References

External links

Municipal fact sheet from Statistics Norway

 
Former municipalities of Norway
Populated places of Arctic Norway
1838 establishments in Norway
2013 disestablishments in Norway